Igreja de São Tiago is a church in Portugal. It is classified as a National Monument.

Sao Tiago Evora
National monuments in Évora District